Monkland is an unincorporated community in Sherman County, Oregon, United States, on Monkland Lane between Sherman Highway 97 and Wasco-Heppner Highway 206. Its post office opened in 1886 and closed in 1919 now served by the Moro, Oregon 97039 post office.

The community may have been named for Monkland, Ontario, as many people near the community came from the town in Ontario.

References

Unincorporated communities in Sherman County, Oregon
1886 establishments in Oregon
Populated places established in 1886
Former populated places in Sherman County, Oregon
Unincorporated communities in Oregon
Ghost towns in Oregon